Sawaiya is a form of poetry which is written in praise of someone in which every verse is a quarter times the length of common verse. The plural of Savaiya is Savaiye (Punjabi: ਸ੍ਵਯੇ ). Famous among them are Tav-Prasad Savaiye, 33 Savaiye, Bhattan De Savaiye.

See also
 33 Savaiye

References

External links
Listen to the Sawaiya being sung

Sikh music